Mohammed Marwa (died 1980), best known by his nickname Maitatsine, was a controversial Muslim preacher in Nigeria. Maitatsine is a Hausa word meaning "the one who damns" and refers to his curse-laden public speeches against the Nigerian state. His militant followers were known as the Yan Tatsine.

Background 
He was originally from Marwa in northern Cameroon. After his education, he moved to Kano, Nigeria in about 1945, where he became known for his controversial preachings on the Qur'an. Maitatsine spoke against the use of radios, watches, bicycles, cars and the possession of more money than necessary.  

The British colonial authorities sent him into exile, but he returned to Kano shortly after independence. By 1972, he had a notable and increasingly militant following known as Yan Tatsine.  In 1975, he was again arrested by Nigerian police for slander and public abuse of political authorities  But in that period he began to receive acceptance from religious authorities, especially after making hajj, the Muslim pilgrimage to Mecca. As his following increased in the 1970s, so did the number of confrontations between his adherents and the police. His preaching attracted largely a following of youths, unemployed migrants, and those who felt that mainstream Muslim teachers were not doing enough for their communities.  By December 1980, continued Yan Tatsine attacks on other religious figures and police forced the Nigerian army to become involved.  Subsequent armed clashes led to the deaths of around 5,000 people, including Maitatsine himself.  Maitatsine died shortly after sustaining injuries in the clashes either from his wounds or from a heart attack.

According to a 2010 article published by the Sunday Trust magazine, the Nigerian military cremated Maitatsine's remains, which now rest in a bottle kept at a police laboratory in Kano.

Legacy 
Despite Mohammed Marwa's death, Yan Tatsine riots continued into the early 1980s. In October 1982 riots erupted in Bulumkuttu, near Maidaguri, and in Kaduna, to where many Yan Tatsine adherents had moved after 1980.  Over 3,000 people died.  Some survivors of these altercations moved to Yola, and in early 1984 more violent uprisings occurred in that city.  In this round of rioting, Musa Makaniki, a close disciple of Maitatsine, emerged as a leader and Marwa's successor.  Ultimately, more than 1,000 people died in Yola and roughly half of the city's 60,000 inhabitants were left homeless.  Makaniki fled to his hometown of Gombe, where more Yan Tatsine riots occurred in April 1985.  After the deaths of several hundred people Makaniki retreated to Cameroon, where he remained until 2004 when he was arrested in Nigeria.

Some analysts view the terrorist group Boko Haram as an extension of the Maitatsine riots.

See also 
Boko Haram
Religious violence in Nigeria
Islam in Nigeria

Literature
 Allan Christelow, Abdalla Uba Adamu: Art. "Mai Tatsine" in John L. Esposito (ed.): The Oxford Encyclopedia of the Islamic World. 6 Bde. Oxford 2009. Bd. III, S. 459-462.

References

External links
BBC World Service - Witness:  Maitatsine - original broadcast 27 December 2012
The 1982 Maitatsine uprisings in Nigeria: a note
What We Can Learn From the Maitatsine History (Tunde Leye’s Friday Thoughts), by Demola T. Olarewaju - Jun 14, 2013
Radical Islam in the Lake Chad Basin, 1805-2009: From the Jihad to Boko Haram, Written by S. U. Fwatshak,
 MAITATSINE BLOODBATH; NIGERIA'S RELIGIOUS TERROR OF THE 80'S (PHOTOS + VIDEO). Saturday, December 28, 2013. 
 Boko Haram: History, Ideas and Revolt. By Shehu Sani,  Newsdiaryonline  Wed Aug 3,2011.

1980 deaths
Riots and civil disorder in Nigeria
20th-century births
People from Kano State
People from Maroua
Nigerian Quranist Muslims
Founders of new religious movements
Self-declared messiahs